Petra Vajdová (born 29 April 1985) is a Slovak actress. At the 2016 DOSKY Awards she won in the category of Best Actress, for her performances in the play Fanny a Alexander at the Slovak National Theater. In 2017 Vajdová took part in the Markíza series Let's Dance, but withdrew in October after sustaining an injury to her leg.

Selected filmography 
Búrlivé víno (television, 2012)
 (2014)

References

External links

1985 births
Living people
Slovak film actresses
Slovak stage actresses
Slovak television actresses
People from Martin, Slovakia
21st-century Slovak actresses